This is a list of regions of Yemen by Human Development Index as of 2023 with data for the year 2021.

References 

Yemen
Yemen
Human Development Index